The women's doubles competition of the table tennis event at the 2009 Southeast Asian Games will be held from 8 to 15 December at the Convention Hall, National University of Laos in Vientiane, Laos.

Participating nations
A total of 30 athletes from eight nations competed in mixed doubles table tennis at the 2009 Southeast Asian Games:

Schedule
All times are Laos Time (UTC+07:00).

Results

References

External links
 

2009 Southeast Asian Games events
2009
2009 in table tennis